Conus attenuatus, common name the thin cone, is a species of sea snail, a marine gastropod mollusk in the family Conidae, the cone snails and their allies.

Like all species within the genus Conus, these snails are predatory and venomous. They are capable of "stinging" humans, therefore live ones should be handled carefully or not at all.

Distribution
This species occurs in the Caribbean Sea and the Gulf of Mexico; also off the Mid-Atlantic Ridge.

Description 
The maximum recorded shell length is 28 mm.

Habitat 
Minimum recorded depth is 10 m. Maximum recorded depth is 81 m.

References

 Filmer R.M. (2001). A Catalogue of Nomenclature and Taxonomy in the Living Conidae 1758 – 1998. Backhuys Publishers, Leiden. 388pp.
 Rabiller M. & Richard G. (2019). Conidae offshore de Guadeloupe : Description du matériel dragué lors de l'expédition KARUBENTHOS 2 contenant de nouvelles espèces. Xenophora Taxonomy. 24: 3–31.

External links
 Reeve L.A. (1843–1844). Monograph of the genus Conus. In: Conchologia Iconica, vol. 1, pl. 1-47 and unpaginated text. L. Reeve & Co., London. [pl. 1-3 without imprinted date, assumed to be January 1843; stated dates: pl. 4, January 1843; pl. 5, june 1843; pl. 6-7, March 1843; pl. 8-10, April 1843; pl. 12-13, May 1843; pl. 11, 14–16, June 1843; pl. 17-19, July 1843; pl. 20-23, August 1843; pl. 24-26, September 1843; pl. 27-28, October 1843; pl. 29-35, November 1843; 36–39, December 1843; pl. 40-43, January 1844; pl. 44-47, February 1844] 
 Reeve, L. A. (1844 ["1843"]). Descriptions of new species of shells figured in the ‛Conchologia Iconica'. Proceedings of the Zoological Society of London. 11: 168–197
 Sowerby, G.B. II (1857–1858). Monograph of the genus Conus. In: G.B. Sowerby II (ed.), Thesaurus Conchyliorum, vol. 3(17): 1–24, pls. 187–195 [1–9](1857); 3(18): 25–56, pl. 196-210 [10–24] (1858). London, privately published
 Adams A. (1854 ['1853"]). Descriptions of new species of the genus Conus, from the collection of Hugh Cuming, Esq. Proceedings of the Zoological Society of London. 21: 116–119 
  Rosenberg, G.; Moretzsohn, F.; García, E. F. (2009). Gastropoda (Mollusca) of the Gulf of Mexico, pp. 579–699 in: Felder, D.L. and D.K. Camp (eds.), Gulf of Mexico–Origins, Waters, and Biota. Texas A&M Press, College Station, Texas
 The Conus Biodiversity website
 Cone Shells – Knights of the Sea
 
 Petit, R. E. (2009). George Brettingham Sowerby, I, II & III: their conchological publications and molluscan taxa. Zootaxa. 2189: 1–218.
  Puillandre N., Duda T.F., Meyer C., Olivera B.M. & Bouchet P. (2015). One, four or 100 genera? A new classification of the cone snails. Journal of Molluscan Studies. 81: 1–23

attenuatus
Gastropods described in 1844